Papyrus 15 (in the Gregory-Aland numbering), signed by 𝔓15, is an early copy of the New Testament in Greek. It was originally a papyrus manuscript of the Pauline Corpus of letters, but now only contains 1 Corinthians 7:18-8:4. The manuscript has been palaeographically assigned to the 3rd century.

Description 

The manuscript is written in a documentary hand. There are about 37-38 lines per page. Grenfeld and Hunt conjectured that 𝔓15 and 𝔓16 might have been part of the same manuscript. Both manuscripts have the same formation of letters, line space, and punctuation.

The Greek text of this codex is probably a representative of the Alexandrian text-type, however the text is too brief to determine this exactly. Aland placed it in Category I. It was the last papyrus classified by Gregory, in 1915. It is currently housed at the Egyptian Museum (JE 47423) in Cairo.

See also 

 List of New Testament papyri

References

Further reading 

 B. P. Grenfell & A. S. Hunt, The Amherst Papyri VII, (London 1910), pp. 4–8.

External links 

 P. Oxy. 1008 – image

Egyptian Museum
New Testament papyri
3rd-century biblical manuscripts
Early Greek manuscripts of the New Testament
First Epistle to the Corinthians papyri